Edra Jean Peaker (born 1942) is an American actress. Peaker is best known for her appearances in the movie Hello Dolly! and in the TV musical series That's Life.

Biography
Peaker was born in Tulsa, Oklahoma, and graduated from Centennial High School in Pueblo, Colorado. She began acting in high school plays and attended the University of New Mexico and the University of Vienna for  years each.

On television, Peaker portrayed Gloria Quigley in That's Life, Rose Harris in The Greatest American Hero, and Carla St. James in Madame's Place. She was also a co-host of the syndicated variety series Top of the Month..

She played Minnie Fay in the 1969 movie Hello, Dolly!. She was the associate producer of the 1993 made-for-TV movie Broken Promises: Taking Emily Back. She has made over 50 television commercials, guest-starred on television and appeared in films.

Peaker lives in Encino, California where she has been a champion of the homeless.

Selected filmography

Television

Route 66 .... Olivia Devereaux (1964)
Occasional Wife .... Ginger Snap ( 1966)
That Girl .... Sheila (1966)
The Flying Nun .... Diane (1967)
Good Morning World .... Genevieve (1968)
That's Life .... Gloria Quigley (1968)
Three's a Crowd .... Ann Carson (1969)
Disneyland Showtime.... Herself (1970)
The Odd Couple .... Julie (1971)
Night Gallery .... Nurse (1971)
Cade's County .... Gerri Randell (1971)
Banyon .... Jan Shelton (1972)
Love, American Style (1969–1973)
Police Woman .... Kathy Brooks (1974)
Get Christie Love! .... Connie Sawyer (1975)
The Rockford Files .... Jeannie Szymczyk (1975)
The Four Deuces .... Lori Rogers, the Songbird (1976)
Barnaby Jones .... Sheila Wild (1976)
Most Wanted (1976)
The Streets of San Francisco .... Beth Herrick (1972–1976)
Quincy, M.E. .... Michelle Rowan (1977)
Wonder Woman .... Lois (1978)
Charlie's Angels .... Donna Dawson (1978)
The Greatest American Hero .... Reseda Rose Blake (1981)
Madame's Place .... Carla St. James (1982)
CBS Schoolbreak Special .... Barbara Kopchek (1987)
Houston Knights (1988)
Hunter .... Claire Prossi (1990)
Out of This World .... Carla (1991)
Surviving Gilligan's Island .... Natalie Schafer (2001)

Features

Hello, Dolly! (1969) .... Minnie Fay
Getting Away from It All (1972) .... Alice Selby
The All-American Boy (1973) .... Janelle Sharkey
Graduation Day (1981) .... Blondie
Fire in the Night (1986) .... Mary Swanson
Private Road: No Trespassing (1987) .... Virginia Milshaw
The Banker (1989) .... Renee
Dreamrider (1993) .... Mrs. Jennings
The Last Producer (2000) .... Rosie

References

External links
 
 

American film actresses
American musical theatre actresses
Actresses from Tulsa, Oklahoma
1944 births
Living people
University of New Mexico alumni
20th-century American actresses
21st-century American women